Travelers Home may refer to:
 Hearst, California
 Yolo, California